Helloworld is an Australian travel and lifestyle television program. It is created through a partnership between Helloworld Travel Limited and the Seven Network. Helloworld is hosted by a group of Australian television personalities that include Bec Hewitt, Ray Martin, Matt Wilson, Ashley Hart, Vince Sorrenti and Giaan Rooney. The program is currently broadcast across the Seven Network, 7two, 7mate, 7flix and 7plus.

History

Nine Network era (2018-19) 

The first season premiered on 7 October 2018 on the Nine Network, which had initially partnered with Helloworld Travel to produce the series. The original presenters are Ray Martin, Denis Walter, Vince Sorrenti, Sonia Kruger, Steven Jacobs, Bec Hewitt, Lauren Phillips, Matt Wilson and Ashley Hart.

The series features both Australian and international locations, promoting tourist destinations around the world, and offering viewers access to special deals following each segment.

Seven Network era (Since 2019) 
In October 2019, it was announced that the second season will air in partnership with the Seven Network. Giaan Rooney joins the show as a presenter with Bec Hewitt, Ray Martin, Matt Wilson, Ashley Hart and Vince Sorrenti returning as presenters. The show's logo along with the theme song and graphics were updated.

After the second season finale in March 2020, due to the COVID-19 pandemic the show did not return for its third season until October 2021.

Presenters 
Ashley Hart
Bec Hewitt
Matt Wilson
Ray Martin
Vince Sorrenti
Denis Walter (series 1)
Lauren Phillips (series 1)
Sonia Kruger (series 1)
Steven Jacobs (Series 1)
Giaan Rooney (series 2-)

Series overview

See also 
 Getaway
 Postcards
 Luxury Escapes
 List of Australian television series

References

External links 
 

Nine Network original programming
Seven Network original programming
7two original programming
7mate original programming
7flix original programming
2018 Australian television series debuts
Television productions postponed due to the COVID-19 pandemic